

References

R